São Romão is a former civil parish in the municipality of Seia, Portugal. In 2013, the parish merged into the new parish Seia, São Romão e Lapa dos Dinheiros. It has a land area of 17.92 km2 and 6,500 inhabitants.

It was the county seat from the 13th century until 1836. It consisted of one parish and had, in 1801, 1426 inhabitants.

Festivals and Fairs 

 Festival of Saint Peter (last Sunday in June)
 Weekly Fair (Sunday)
 St. Silvester (January 1)
 St. Sebastian (April 20)
 Burial of the Lord (Friday of the Lord)
 St. Peter (last Sunday in June)
 São Romão (August 9)
 Our Lady of the Exile (August 15)

Heritage
 Chapel of the eighteenth century
 Shrine of Our Lady of Exile

References

Freguesias of Seia
Former parishes of Portugal